Spike and Tyke is a short-lived theatrical animated short subject series, based upon the American bulldog father-and-son team from Metro-Goldwyn-Mayer's Tom and Jerry cartoons. The characters first appeared in the Tom and Jerry series in the 1940s.

Only two films were made in this spin-off series: Give and Tyke and Scat Cats, both made and released in 1957, and produced in CinemaScope, as the cartoon studio shut down the year the spin-off series was started. Homer Brightman wrote both the episodes. 

The cartoons were produced and directed by Tom and Jerry creators William Hanna and Joseph Barbera, and were among the last of the original MGM theatrical cartoons made. The studio was shut down in mid 1957 and Hanna and Barbera would move on to television animation production success with their own Hanna-Barbera Productions.

Spike was voiced by Billy Bletcher, and later Daws Butler. Tyke did not talk in the theatrical shorts, (possibly his barks were done by co-creator William Hanna) but did speak on the Fox Kids television series Tom & Jerry Kids, for which the duo appeared in their own segments, and occasionally in the Tom and Jerry segments. Spike and Tyke were voiced by Richard Gautier and Patric Zimmerman, respectively. Later, they appeared in the straight to video film Tom and Jerry: The Magic Ring Spike was voiced by Maurice LaMarche and Tyke's barks were done by Frank Welker.

Spike & Tyke shorts

See also
Spike and Tyke (characters)
Augie Doggie and Doggie Daddy

References

External links
Spike and Tyke at Don Markstein's Toonopedia. Archived from the original on August 8, 2017.
 
 

Film series introduced in 1957
Animated film series
MGM cartoon characters
Tom and Jerry
Metro-Goldwyn-Mayer animated short films
Tom and Jerry short films
Metro-Goldwyn-Mayer cartoon studio film series